Ghajini  is a 2005 Indian Tamil-language action thriller film directed by A. R. Murugadoss and produced by Salem Chandrasekharan. The film stars Suriya and Asin in the lead, with Nayanthara, Pradeep Rawat and Riyaz Khan in supporting roles. Harris Jayaraj composed the soundtrack and background music, while R. D. Rajasekhar and Anthony were the film's cinematographer and editor, respectively. It revolves around a businessman who suffers from anterograde amnesia and is on a spree to avenge the murder of his girlfriend. 

The film's production began shortly afterwards in April and was completed by September on the same year. The film was shot at Chennai, while two song sequences were filmed in Switzerland. It was dubbed and released in Telugu by Allu Aravind in November 2005, and received positive reviews with praise for the performances of the lead pair and the plot. It was remade into a Hindi film by Murugadoss again in 2008, with Asin, Rawat and Khan reprising their roles while Suriya's and Nayanthara's roles are played by Aamir Khan and Jiah Khan. The film's story takes inspiration from the Christopher Nolan film Memento (2000) and the 1951 film Happy Go Lovely.

Plot
Chitra, a medical student and her friends are working on a project about the human brain. She wants to investigate the curious case of Sanjay Ramaswamy, a notable Chennai-based businessman who is reported to have anterograde amnesia. Her professor denies access to Sanjay's records as it is currently under criminal investigation. Chitra, overcome with curiosity, proceeds to investigate the matter herself in secret. Sanjay is suffering from anterograde amnesia; he loses his memory every 15 minutes and uses a system of photographs, notes, and tattoos to recover his memory after each cycle. It is revealed that Sanjay is ultimately out to avenge the death of his lover Kalpana, and that he is systematically killing the people responsible. 

Sanjay's main target is Lakshman, the head of a Kolkata-based human trafficking network and a notable socialite in Chennai. Inspector Ravi is on the case of the serial murders, who tracks Sanjay at his flat, knocks him unconscious. Ravi finds two diaries where Sanjay has chronicled the events of his life. Sanjay Ramaswamy is the owner of the AirVoice mobile telephone company, who meets Kalpana, a struggling model, and secretly develops romantic feelings for her, while introducing himself as "Manohar". Eventually, both of them spend time together and gradually develop a liking towards each other. The diary ends with Sanjay proposing to Kalpana and promising himself that he will reveal himself as Sanjay Ramaswamy if she accepts. 

Before Ravi can read the 2003 diary, Sanjay regains consciousness and ties him up. He tracks down Lakshman to a college function where Lakshman is the guest of honor. Sanjay takes pictures of Lakshman and decides to kill him. However, Sanjay mistakenly attacks and kills one of Lakshman's goons in the parking lot. Lakshman is perplexed and fails to recollect the incident. He decides to find and kill his enemies one by one, but Sanjay is not among them. In the meantime, Chitra visits Sanjay's flat and finds Ravi, beaten and bound. Chitra finds the two diaries and frees Ravi. Sanjay arrives suddenly; he remembers neither of them and chases them out. Ravi is eventually hit and killed by a bus, while Chitra barely escapes, going into a phone booth. 

Believing Lakshman is in danger, Chitra informs him that Sanjay is after him. Sanjay discovers that Chitra had warned Lakshman and goes to her dormitory to kill her, where Chitra calls the police and Sanjay is arrested but later freed. Lakshman discovers about Sanjay through a police inquiry and arrives at Sanjay's flat, destroying all the photographs, notes, and scratching off Sanjay's tattoos. Chitra reads the second diary, which states that Kalpana accepted the proposal, but on the condition that she marry only after she completes her past commitment. The diary ends abruptly as Sanjay left for a business trip. Chitra investigates further and discovers that Kalpana was travelling to Mumbai for a modelling assignment by train when she rescued 25 innocent young Tamil girls being trafficked to Mumbai and Kolkata. 

However, Lakshman, who is the ringleader of the racket killed those two girls, who recognized him and goes in search of Kalpana. His goons broke into her apartment and tried to kill her, only to be overpowered and fought off by Sanjay, but Lakshman attacks Sanjay and kills Kalpana in the same way. Now avare of the truth, Chitra finds Sanjay in the hospital and tells him the truth. Sanjay tells her to lead him to Lakshman. Lakshman's twin brother Ram arrives from Kolkata to help him pursue Sanjay. Arriving at Lakshman's lair in downtown Chennai, Sanjay confronts all of Lakshman's henchmen and, with superior strength, manages to disable them. Sanjay fights Lakshman and Ram, overpowering and killing the brothers. While Sanjay drives Chitra back to her dormitory, he stops at a crossing to let young children cross the road. A young girl smiles at him, and he smiles back at her.

Cast
 Suriya as Sanjay Ramaswamy, a rich businessman; the chairman of a mobile phone company, Air Voice; who later suffers from short-term memory loss after a tragic incident caused by Ram and Lakshman, being solely motivated, thus, to kill him and his cohorts.
 Asin as Kalpana, a model who gains publicity by falsely proclaiming herself to be the girlfriend of Sanjay Ramaswamy, but soon becomes his love interest, later getting killed by Lakshman.
 Nayanthara as Chitra, a medical student, who tries to study the case of Sanjay Ramaswamy and his amnesiac problem, even though she is forbidden to do so
 Pradeep Rawat in a dual role as Ram and Lakshman, the main antagonists and leaders of a human trafficking network. A gang honcho and the mastermind of many illegal and criminal ventures who is targeted by Sanjay
 Riyaz Khan as Inspector Ravibarnaboss, who is investigating the murders by Sanjay
 Manobala as the owner of the advertising film where Kalpana worked
 Sathyan as a person whom Kalpana asks to impersonate as Sanjay for a function
 Ramanathan as a college professor
 Pondy Ravi as a bus conductor
 Karate Raja as Lakshman's henchman

Production

The film was initially announced as Mirattal in January 2004 with Ajith Kumar and Jyothika, but later got shelved.In March 2004 NIC Arts came to produce the same story as film with Ajith Kumar and Jyothika was replaced by Asin Thottumkal. They started with a photo shoot with the lead stars. Yuvan Shankar Raja was then signed as the music director. However the project fell through and negotiations with Madhavan also collapsed. In November 2004, it was announced that the project was revived by Salem Chandrasekhar and that Suriya would portray the leading role. Suriya subsequently had to tonsure his head for the film before production, with Asin retaining her role while Shriya Saran and Prakash Raj were selected to play other roles in the film. Murugadoss said that he had narrated the script to 12 actors but none of them agreed, Suriya was the 13th actor. It was revealed that Asin would play the role of Kalpana, with the name being inspired by the late Indian astronaut Kalpana Chawla. Shriya was later replaced by Nayantara for the second leading female role, after the former became busy with other films and Pradeep Rawat replaced Prakash Raj. For the character of the rich tycoon, Suriya had closely observed the garment exporter, Tagore Bakshani.

The film was launched on 11 February 2005 at AVM Studios in Chennai with the cast of the project in attendance. In early April 2005, two songs for the film were shot in Switzerland with costumes brought in from Paris for the shooting. Shooting continued and the film finished production in July 2005.

Themes and influences
Ghajini was inspired by the American film Memento, which itself was adapted from the short story Memento Mori. In response to allegations of plagiarism, Aamir Khan noted "Murgadoss had heard about a film called Memento and the concept had really fascinated him. Without having seen the film he went ahead and wrote his own version of the script and screenplay. Having finished his script, he then saw Memento, found it very different from what he had written, and went ahead and made Ghajini." Malathi Rangarajan of The Hindu stated that: "Those who have watched Memento, will not miss the similarities between the English flick and Ghajini. Yet Murugadas's ingenuity lies in adapting the inspiration to suit the taste of the audience". Murugadoss stated, "I had written half the story of Ghajini when I saw Memento. I liked the character in the film who remembers things for just 15 minutes. So, I used just that character."

Several comical scenes in the film are similar to Happy Go Lovely (1951). The film's title is a reference to Mahmud of Ghazni, the tenth-century Sultan of Ghaznavid Empire whose name is pronounced "Ghajini" in Tamil.

Soundtrack
The soundtrack features five songs composed by Harris Jayaraj. Harris Jayaraj received his third Tamil Nadu State Film Award for Best Music Director and was nominated for the Filmfare Award for Best Music Director. Regarding the song "Suttum Vizhi", Harris said that when Murugadoss narrated him the situation in which the hero is full of admiration for the heroine's attitude and compassion and he dreams of her. Initially, he thought of a peppy song but after hours of discussion, he decided on a melodious tune.

Release
The satellite rights of the film were sold to Sun TV. Ghajini was censored with a "U/A" by Central Board of Film Certification, with few minor cuts.

Critical response
The film received critical acclaim. Sify wrote: "Full marks to the director and Surya for coming out with one of the best edge-of-the-seat racy thriller seen in recent times. The Hindu wrote that "Ghajini is recommended for those who seek extra strong, stylish, over-the-top entertainment" and also wrote that ", it is an action film with plenty of intense, dark and suspenseful filled moments".
Indiaglitz stated that: "Director Murugadoss has made bold with an absolutely new idea and to his eternal credit makes it work with finesse and flashiness" and also wrote that "it is an impressive story told in an inventive manner".

After the release of the Hindi remake, Christopher Nolan spoke fondly of the success of the film. He said, "I have heard it was very successful, I heard people liked it. So I will watch it at some point. I was aware of it, and I am very honoured".

Box office
The film and its dubbed Telugu release opened to high critical acclaim. Ghajini was a commercial success and became the third highest grossing Tamil film of that year. Ghajini, together with Chandramukhi and Anniyan, earned more than three times their combined cost of production.

The Telugu version was also successful and did better business than many straight Telugu films. The film's success earned Suriya a fan following in Andhra. It also prompted producers in the Telugu film industry, to acquire the dubbing rights to Suriya's Tamil films and release them in Telugu.

Awards and nominations
In addition to the following list of awards and nominations, prominent Indian film websites named Ghajini one of the 10 best Tamil films of 2005, with Rediff, Sify and Behindwoods all doing the same. The film also featured, prior to release, in the "most awaited" list from film websites.

Remakes
Aamir Khan who saw the original film decided to remake the film in Hindi. Murugadoss again directed the Hindi version. Asin reprised her character and the film marked her debut in Bollywood. The climax in Hindi version was slightly altered with Murugadoss revealing that Aamir rewrote the climax portions. The remake version was released in 2008 to positive reviews and became a successful film at the box office. Munirathna announced that he would remake the film in Kannada with Upendra and Divya Spandana. However the remake failed to materialise; instead Telugu film Manmadhudu (2002) was remade as Aishwarya (2006) and few scenes were borrowed from Ghajini.

Legacy
The film's success established Suriya as an action hero and Asin as a top actress. Asin described Kalpana in Ghajini as "a life-time role" for her. Nayanthara, who appeared in a supporting character, later said that appearing in Ghajini was a big mistake and the "worst decision" she ever took.

In a comedy scene from Kovai Brothers (2006), Ganesh (Sathyaraj) parodies Suriya's bald look from Ghajini to impress Namitha. In Pokkiri (2007), Body Soda (Vadivelu) imagines himself dancing for the song "Suttum Vizhi" with Sruthi (Asin). In Thamizh Padam (2010), Shiva (Shiva) remembers that he has to kill gangster Swarna when he looks at a Polaroid photo of her. In the Telugu film Dubai Seenu (2007), Seenu (Ravi Teja) plays a prank on Inspector Babji (Sayaji Shinde) by calling every women and singing "Oka Maaru" (Oru Maalai) and also getting him beaten black and blue.  In Nuvva Nena (2007), Aaku Bhai (Brahmanandam) imagines himself dancing for the song "Hrudayam Ekkadunnadi" (Suttum Vizhi) with Nandini (Shriya Saran).
The title of the Telugu film Hrudayam Ekkadunnadi (2014) is based on the song of the same name from the Telugu version. In the 2014 Kannada film Kwatle Satisha, a remake of Tamil film Naduvula Konjam Pakkatha Kaanom (2012), the first look poster featured the film's actor Sathish Ninasam in the look inspired from Ghajini. 2018 film Ghajinikanth was named as a portmanteau of the words "Ghajini" and "Rajinikanth", and was titled so because of the forgetful nature of Rajinikanth's character in Dharmathin Thalaivan and Suriya's character in Ghajini (2005).

See also 
 List of mental disorders in film
 The Father (2020 film)

References

External links
 
 

2005 films
Indian remakes of American films
Indian action thriller films
2005 action thriller films
2000s mystery thriller films
Indian mystery thriller films
Films about amnesia
Films about tattooing
Films set in Chennai
Twins in Indian films
Indian vigilante films
Films directed by AR Murugadoss
2000s Tamil-language films
2005 psychological thriller films
Tamil-language psychological thriller films
Films scored by Harris Jayaraj
Tamil films remade in other languages
Films shot in Switzerland
Films shot in Chennai
Indian nonlinear narrative films
2000s business films